Marcus Vinicius Molinari Reis (30 December 1997 – 24 January 2021) was a Brazilian footballer. He died in the 2021 Palmas FR plane crash.

Career statistics

Club

Notes

References

1997 births
2021 deaths
Brazilian footballers
Association football midfielders
Campeonato Brasileiro Série D players
Villa Nova Atlético Clube players
Araxá Esporte Clube players
Santos FC players
Tupi Football Club players
Ipatinga Futebol Clube players
Tupynambás Futebol Clube players
Palmas Futebol e Regatas players
Victims of aviation accidents or incidents in Brazil
Victims of aviation accidents or incidents in 2021
Sportspeople from Tocantins